The list of shipwrecks in July 1831 includes ships sunk, foundered, grounded, or otherwise lost during July 1831.

5 July

7 July

11 July

12 July

13 July

16 July

18 July

21 July

26 July

29 July

Unknown date

References

1831-07